The Life Foundation is a fictional survivalist group appearing in American comic books published by Marvel Comics. Primarily an enemy of Spider-Man and Venom, the organization exists within Marvel's main shared universe, known as the Marvel Universe. Created by writer David Michelinie and artist Todd McFarlane, it first appeared in The Amazing Spider-Man Vol. 1, #298 (March 1988).

Life Foundation appears in the Sony's Spider-Man Universe live action film Venom (2018).

Publication history 

The Life Foundation was introduced in The Amazing Spider-Man Vol. 1, #298-299 and went on to appear in The Amazing Spider-Man #320-321, The Amazing Spider-Man #324 and The Amazing Spider-Man #351-352, as well as the "Hero Killers" storyline that ran through The Amazing Spider-Man Annual Vol. 1, #26, The Spectacular Spider-Man Annual Vol. 1, #12, Web of Spider-Man Annual Vol. 1, #8 and The New Warriors Annual Vol. 1, #2, and was subsequently featured in Venom: Lethal Protector #3-5 and Spider-Man: The Arachnis Project #1-6, and made its last appearance to date in a flashback sequence in Venom: Separation Anxiety #2.

Fictional organization history 
A sophisticated and unscrupulous corporate survivalist group, the Life Foundation was founded in response to Cold War paranoia, and is dedicated to constructing doomsday-proof communities for both its own members and society's elite who can reserve a spot in these facilities for a minimum payment of $5,000,000.

The Life Foundation hires Chance to steal European armaments being shipped to Manhattan, offering $25,000. Chance reports back to the Life Foundation after the heist, but is knocked out and taken prisoner by the group's leader Carlton Drake. Drake has Chance brought to his survivalist facility Sanctum Maximus in New Jersey, and orders that Chance be tortured into revealing how the mercenary's powered exoskeleton works to be mass-produced for the Life Foundation's benefit. Spider-Man discovers and releases Chance, and the two destroy the Life Foundation's base.

Months later, the Life Foundation has the foreign client Chakane due to plotting to assassinate the king of Symkaria, planning to take up residence in the Life Foundation and guarded by mindless superhuman "Protectors". Silver Sable gets wind of their scheme, and acquires more information pertaining to their conspiracy by interrogating Chakane and Drake after Spider-Man and Paladin help break into the Life Foundation's new underground city built in New Jersey yet Drake's resources prevent any prosecution. Spider-Man and Solo afterward capture Toler Weil, Chakane's ally who the Life Foundation had hidden in the Metropolitan Museum of Art.

Afterwards, Drake has the Tri-Sentinel rebuilt and reprogrammed by the Life Foundation, which loses control of the machine when the directives originally given by Loki reassert over the new ones programmed into it by the Life Foundation. Spider-Man and Nova are able to obliterate the Tri-Sentinel using a piece of Antarctic vibranium, but lose a disc containing incriminating information about the Life Foundation's illegal activities while Drake has his men gather all the data and once again evade capture.

The Life Foundation (led by Drake) subsequently appears as one of the corporations involved in the Sphinx's attempt at finding a way to lucratively duplicate the powers of captured superhumans, a plot foiled by Spider-Man and the New Warriors.

Treece International's CEO Roland Treece later has the Life Foundation assist in dealing with Venom interfering with Treece's search for a lost stockpile of gold supposedly buried somewhere beneath a park in San Francisco. At their Mojave facility, Drake has the Life Foundation experiment with the Venom symbiote which extracts five additional symbiotes which bonded with their own mercenaries: Scream, Riot, Agony, Phage and Lasher. The Life Foundation's symbiote enforcers commit random acts of violence throughout San Francisco to test their capabilities, drawing Spider-Man's attention to follows back to the Life Foundation situated in the Mojave Desert. Spider-Man and Eddie Brock team-up to combat the symbiotes, seemingly killing the creatures and depowering their hosts, a development that prompts the Life Foundation (led by Drake) into abandoning and destroying the Mojave facility. Unknown to the Life Foundation, their five symbiote enforcers somehow survive the explosion and rebel against before fleeing to New York City.

Setting up anew in Washington, D.C., the Life Foundation hires the Jury and the mercenary Spoiler to replace their symbiote warriors, and steals artifacts and other valuables to stockpile in their doomsday bunkers due to still believing in World War III. With Drake diagnosed with terminal cancer, the Life Foundation pose as a government branch and offer funding to Toshiro Mikashi, an entomology professor working on an arachnid-based cure for cancer and other ailments called the Arachnis Project. Mikashi eventually realizes who his backers really are and that they intend to exploit this work to create a new race of Homo Arachnis so the Life Foundation keeps Mikashi compliant by threatening his daughter Miho. When one of Mikashi's students stumbles upon the research, the Life Foundation has this student murdered, an act that draws the suspicions of Peter Parker (one of Mikashi's students) to Washington. After Mikashi reveals his involvement with the Life Foundation to Parker, the organization abducts the professor and his daughter, spurring Spider-Man into allowing himself to be captured by the Jury in order to discern the Mikashis' whereabouts. Mikashi reluctantly completes the Arachnis Project formula by using a sample of Spider-Man's DNA which is given to Treece who injects Drake with, intending for the serum to kill (as it was meant to be ingested) and thus allow Treece to usurp the Life Foundation. The concoction instead successfully transforms Drake into the Homo Arachnis which goes on rampage, devouring the Life Foundation's personnel while combating Spider-Man as well as Venom and the mutinying Jury. After Venom traps Drake and evacuates with everyone else in the installation, Mikashi sacrifices himself by sabotaging the Life Foundation's nuclear reactor in order to cause an explosion that will eliminate all of the Arachnis Project's traces. The blast is contained by the facility's shielding, preventing from affecting Washington. The unfazed spider creature afterward digs itself out of the base's remains and sheds its exoskeleton to reveal Drake with a youthful, healthy appearance and swearing revenge on Spider-Man, the Jury, and Venom.

At some point, the Life Foundation declared Chapter 7. Mendel Stromm raided one of their abandoned shelters to unearth and reactivate the Tri-Sentinel.

Carlton Drake, taking advantage of the power vacuum caused by misfortunes that have befallen megacorporation's like Roxxon and Alchemax, rebuilds the Life Foundation, and begins helping Senator Arthur Krane and his Friends of Humanity hunt down the Venom symbiote, seemingly killing Eddie Brock before going after Eddie's son, Dylan.

Membership

Board of Directors 
 Carlton Drake - CEO
 Mr. Gabriel
 Mr. MacVay
 Mr. Pullman
 Ms. Caputo
 Roland Treece - CEO of Treece International

Staff 
 Agent #55 – Field Agent
 Agent #68 – Field Agent
 Agent #77 – Field Agent
 Collins - Scientist
 Emerson - Scientist
 Five Symbiotes - Guards
 Agony (Leslie Gesneria)
 Lasher (Ramon Hernandez)
 Phage (Carl Mach)
 Riot (Trevor Cole)
 Scream (Donna Diego)
 Gomez - Guard
 Julio – A submarine operator who worked alongside Chance.
 Pauly - Guard
 "Protectors" - Mercenaries mutated into mindless, monstrous guardians for a facility in New Jersey.
 Ricardo - Guard
 Tac Squad - Guards

Associates 
 Chance - A mercenary hired to steal European armaments.
 The Jury - Mercenaries employed by a facility in Washington, D.C.
 Orwell Taylor - Leader, and Life Foundation shareholder.
 Bomblast (Parmenter)
 Firearm
 Ramshot (Samuel Culkin) 
 Screech (Maxwell Taylor)
 Sentry (Curtis Elkins)
 Sneak Thief - A superhuman burglar hired to steal artifacts in and around Washington, D.C.
 Spoiler - A superhuman mercenary employed by a facility in Washington, D.C.
 Toshiro Mikashi – An entomology professor blackmailed into working on the Arachnis Project.

In other media

Film 
The Life Foundation appears in the 2018 film Venom. Depicted as a genetics corporation, Carlton Drake is the CEO while Roland Treece is the chief of security. The Life Foundation discovers the symbiotes and performs illegal host experiments involving homeless people, motivating scientist Dora Skirth (portrayed by Jenny Slate) to expose the Life Foundation.

Video games 
The Life Foundation appeared in Venom/Spider-Man: Separation Anxiety as employers of the five symbiotes and The Jury.

References

External links 

 Life Foundation at Comic Vine
 Life Foundation at Marvel Wikia
 

Spider-Man characters
Venom (character)
1988 comics debuts
Fictional companies
Fictional survivalists
Comic book terrorist organizations
Characters created by Todd McFarlane
Characters created by David Michelinie
Fictional organizations in Marvel Comics
Fictional elements introduced in 1988